Baroque Best is the first self-cover album by J-pop duo Two-Mix, released as the duo's first album under WEA Japan on November 26, 1998. It features the duo's hit songs remixed with orchestral backgrounds by Les Solistes de Versailles, the Warsaw National Philharmonic Orchestra, and Orchestre Chimérique.

The album peaked at No. 19 on Oricon's weekly albums chart.

Track listing 
All lyrics are written by Shiina Nagano; all music is composed by Minami Takayama; all music is arranged by Two-Mix.

Charts

References

External links 
 
 

1998 albums
Two-Mix compilation albums
Japanese-language compilation albums
Warner Music Japan compilation albums